The Dublin City Cup is a defunct Irish football tournament which was played for by all League of Ireland sides (and not just those from Dublin city as the name suggests).  It ran from 1933 and ran uninterrupted until 1973.  In the 1975–76 season it was revived and played for by sides who did not reach the League of Ireland Cup quarter-finals.  In 1983–84 it was revived again but only eight teams were invited to play, the six Dublin sides (Bohemians, Shamrock Rovers, Shelbourne, St Patrick's Athletic, UCD and Home Farm) along with Drogheda United and Dundalk.

It was played in a variety of formats; from complete round robin series to straight knock out tournaments. From the 1951–52 season it was played as a knockout tournament. It was traditionally seen as the fourth most important competition for League of Ireland sides (after the League, FAI Cup and League of Ireland Shield or League Cup).

In both 1956–57 and 1959–60 Shamrock Rovers drew with Drumcondra in the final but won the trophy based on the unusual tiebreaker of having been awarded more corner kicks.

List of winners
	1934-35* Dolphin
	1935-36  Bohemians
	1936-37  Sligo Rovers
	1937-38  Dundalk
	1938-39  St James's Gate
	1939-40  Drumcondra
	1940-41  Drumcondra
	1941-42  Shelbourne
	1942-43  Dundalk
	1943-44  Cork United
	1944-45  Shamrock Rovers
	1945-46  Cork United
	1946-47  Shelbourne
	1947-48  Shamrock Rovers
	1948-49  Dundalk
	1949-50  Drumcondra
	1950-51  Drumcondra
	1951-52  Drumcondra
	1952-53  Shamrock Rovers
	1953-54  St Patrick's Athletic
	1954-55  Shamrock Rovers
	1955-56  St Patrick's Athletic
	1956-57  Shamrock Rovers
	1957-58  Shamrock Rovers
	1958-59  Limerick
	1959-60  Shamrock Rovers
	1960-61  Drumcondra
	1961-62  Cork Celtic
	1962-63  Shelbourne
	1963-64  Shamrock Rovers
	1964-65  Shelbourne
	1965-66  Cork Hibernians
	1966-67  Shamrock Rovers
	1967-68  Dundalk
	1968-69  Dundalk
	1969-70  Limerick
	1970-71  Cork Hibernians
	1971-72  Finn Harps
	1972-73  Cork Hibernians
	1975-76  St Patrick's Athletic
	1983-84  Shamrock Rovers

See also
League of Ireland
FAI Cup
League of Ireland Cup
League of Ireland Shield

External links
Dublin City Cup on rsssf.com

Dublin City Cup
Association football in Dublin (city)